Woman Hunt may refer to:

Womanhunt, 1962 American crime film
The Woman Hunt, 1972 American action film shot in the Philippines